A commoner is a person who is not a member of the nobility or priesthood.

Commoner(s) may also refer to:

Status or membership
 Commoner (academia), a term used at some universities for a student not receiving a scholarship or exhibition
 Commoner, a person who is not a member of the British nobility
 Commoner, a person who shares rights over common land
 Commoner, a member of the Court of Common Council of the City of London Corporation
 Commoner, one of the estates of the realm
 Commoner, a member of the House of Commons of the United Kingdom

People with the name
Barry Commoner (1917–2012), American biologist and politician

Arts, entertainment, and media
 Commoner (Dungeons & Dragons), one of the base non-player character categories
The Commoner, a newspaper published in Nebraska from 1901 to 1923, owned and published by William Jennings Bryan

See also
Common (disambiguation)
Commons (disambiguation)
Morganatic marriage
The Great Commoner (disambiguation), a nickname applied to various people
The Masses (disambiguation)